Jochna O Jononir Golpo is a novel by Humayun Ahmed. The novel was published in February, 2004. The novel is based on the Liberation War of Bangladesh. In the novel, by means of an engrossing fictional story which skilfully incorporates various historical figures and many true incidents as well as the author's own personal experiences. The novel was translated into English as Liberation: Josna O Jononir Golpo by Roger Gwynn.

Plot
The story of the novel starts in month of February 1971, when the Arabic teacher of Nilgonj High School, Mawlana Irtazuddin Kashempuri visits his younger brother Shahed and his family in Dhaka. Then the writer describes various stories of the characters. He describes how Mawlana Irtazuddin became a contradictor. How he swore not to perform Jummah Salat until Bangladesh become independent, for which he was shot by Pakistani Military. The writer describes how Shahed searched for his lost wife and daughter. He described the time as "The day and night of uncertainty".

Characters

Characters taken from real life
Sheikh Mujibur Rahman  Father of the nation of Bangladesh
 Family of Sheikh Mujibur Rahman
Ziaur Rahman  Chief of the Z Force
 Family of Ziaur Rahman
Abdul Hamid Khan Bhasani One of the grassroots politicians of twentieth century British India
Ayub Khan  Pakistani army ruler
Yahya Khan  Pakistani army ruler
Tikka Khan  Member of Pakistan Army
Zulfikar Ali Bhutto  Pakistani politician
Shamsur Rahman  poet
Abdul Kader Siddique   is the head of the Kaderia force (Kadeia Bahini)
Humayun Ahmed  The author and narrate his own wartime events in the novel
Faizur Rahman Ahmed  Sub-divisional police chief and father of Humayun Ahmed
Ayesha Begum  Wife of Sub-Divisional Police Chief Faizur Rahman and mother of Humayun Ahmed
Muhammad Zafar Iqbal  Professor, Novelist; the second son of Faizur Rahman and brother of Humayun Ahmed
Humayun Ahmed's family
Rashid  Faizur Rahman's handfan puller
Anis Sabet   Friend of Humayun Ahmed
And others.

Fictional characters
 Shahed  is also a real character but in the novel the writer adds imagination to the truth
 Irtazuddin  Shahed's elder brother
 Asmani  Shahed's wife
 Runi  Shahed's daughter
 Gouranga  Shahed's friend
 Mubarak Hossain  Naimul's father-in-law and police inspector
 Naimul  Shahid's friend and freedom fighter
 Maryam  Naimul's wife and daughter of Mubarak Hossain
 Kalimullah  poet and collaborator for the Pakistani Military
 And others.

See also
 Deyal

References

Further reading
 
 
 

2004 novels
Bangladeshi fiction
Bangladesh Liberation War fiction
Bangladesh Liberation War books
Novels by Humayun Ahmed
Cultural depictions of Sheikh Mujibur Rahman